In statistics and uncertainty analysis, the Welch–Satterthwaite equation is used to calculate an approximation to the effective degrees of freedom of a linear combination of independent sample variances, also known as the pooled degrees of freedom, corresponding to the pooled variance.

For  sample variances , each respectively having  degrees of freedom, often one computes the linear combination.

where  is a real positive number, typically . In general, the probability distribution of {{math|χ}} cannot be expressed analytically.  However, its distribution can be approximated by another chi-squared distribution, whose effective degrees of freedom are given by the Welch–Satterthwaite equation'''

There is no assumption that the underlying population variances  are equal. This is known as the Behrens–Fisher problem.

The result can be used to perform approximate statistical inference tests.  The simplest application of this equation is in performing Welch's t-test.

See also
 Pooled variance

References

Further reading
 
   
 
 Michael Allwood (2008) "The Satterthwaite Formula for Degrees of Freedom in the Two-Sample t-Test", AP Statistics'', Advanced Placement Program, The College Board. 

Theorems in statistics
Equations
Statistical approximations